Faber-Castell AG is a manufacturer of pens, pencils, other office supplies (e.g., staplers, slide rules, erasers, rulers) and art supplies, as well as high-end writing instruments and luxury leather goods. Headquartered in Stein, Germany, it operates 14 factories and 20 sales units throughout the globe. The Faber-Castell Group employs a staff of approximately 8,000 and does business in more than 120 countries. The House of Faber-Castell is the family which founded and continues to exercise leadership within the corporation. Faber-Castell manufactures about 2 billion pencils in more than 120 different colors every year.

History 
Faber-Castell was founded in 1761 in Stein, Germany, by cabinet maker Kaspar Faber (1730–84) as the A.W. Faber Company. It has remained in the Faber family for eight generations. The company expanded under Kaspar Faber's great-grandson, Johann Lothar Freiherr von Faber (1817–96), and his wife, Ottilie.
 Lothar opened branches in New York (1849), London (1851), Paris (1855), and expanded into Vienna (1872) and St. Petersburg (1874). The company also began offering products other than pencils, opening a factory in Geroldsgrün, Bavaria, where slide rules were produced, a slate factory in Geroldsgrün, and producing ink and paint in Noisy-le-Sec, near Paris. 

To combat counterfeit A.W. Faber products, Lothar petitioned the Reichstag to put in place trademark protections in Germany. As a result, the Act on Trade Mark Protection came into effect in 1875, and protections were expanded in the 1894 Act on the Protection of Trade Marks. Lothar's first trademark was registered in 1894, with the registration number DE 43. Outside of Germany, the trademark was also registered in the United States (where it was one of the earliest ever registered), Russia, England, Spain, France, and Italy during Lothar's time at the head of the company. 

In 1898, Lothar's granddaughter and heiress, Ottilie "Tilly" von Faber, married Count Alexander zu Castell-Rüdenhausen, and the couple took on the surname of Faber-Castell. Seven years later, the company began producing a new line of pencils, called "Castell"; over the next few years, this line developed recognizable branding, featuring the green color of the pencils (chosen to match the color of Alexander's military regiment), a logo depicting a castle, and the motif of two jousting knights, which was used on packaging and in advertising. This motif originated with a painting, commissioned by Alexander, of two knights jousting with pencils, and would eventually become the inspiration behind the company's current logo. 1908 saw the release of the Polychromos coloured pencils, which continue to be made and widely used today.

As a German company, several of the Faber-Castell's foreign subsidiaries and branches in Allied countries were confiscated during World War I. Among them, the Faber-Castell properties in New York and Paris were eventually sold off. Nevertheless, the company survived and saw further growth following the war with the construction of new, expanded manufacturing facilities and new company acquisitions. The company's name was also officially changed following Alexander's death in 1928, becoming A.W. Faber "Castell" Bleistiftfabrik (Pencil Company).  Alexander's son, Roland von Faber-Castell, took over as head of the company after his father's death, at the beginning of the Great Depression of the 1930s. To mitigate the effects of this downturn, the company entered into an agreement with Johann Faber, the eponymous pencil company founded by Lothar's brother, in 1932.  The two shared resources in an effort to operate more efficiently and bring down their costs. In the following years, Roland gradually bought up shares of Johann Faber until it was fully acquired (along with its Brazilian subsidiary) in 1942. Johann Faber was the company which originally produced the Goldfaber line of colored pencils, which were made by Faber-Castell following the acquisition. Faber-Castell also acquired the fountain pen maker Osmia during this period. Also in 1942, the company went through another name change, becoming A. W. Faber-Castell. 

In the years following World War II, the company expanded internationally into Ireland, Austria, Peru, Australia, and Argentina, as well as re-acquiring several subsidiaries which had been lost in wartime.  It also began offering new products, such as a mechanical pencil, ballpoint pens, plastic slide rules (instead of wood), and an India ink drawing pen. The Faber-Castell logo was changed in 1950 to an oval design, incorporating the Faber-Castell family crest and the green color which the company had been using since 1905.

Today, the company operates 10 factories and 22 sales units, with six in Europe, four in Asia, three in North America, five in South America, and one each in Australia and New Zealand. The Faber-Castell Group employs a staff of approximately 8,000 and does business in more than 120 countries.

Products 

Beginning in the 1850s Faber started to use graphite from Siberia and cedar wood from Florida to produce its pencils.

Faber-Castell is well known for its brand of PITT Artist pens. The pens, used by comic and manga artists such as Adam Hughes, contain an India ink that is both acid-free and archival, and come in a variety of colors.

The following chart contains all the Faber-Castell product lines.

From about 1880 to 1975 Faber-Castell was also one of the world's major manufacturers of slide rules, the best known of which was the 2/83N.

Manufacturing
There are about 16 manufacturing plants (in 10 countries) which mainly manufacture writing instruments.

See also 

 Graf von Faber-Castell
 Faber-Castell family

References

External links 

 
 Graf von Faber-Castell – Luxury writing instruments
 Faber-Castell slide rule collection
 Faber-Castell: The future of the pencil
 Faber-Castell's eraser collection
 BBC visits Nuremberg in Germany to look at Staedtler and Faber-Castell's productive pencil rivalry. Audio, 28 minutes.
 

Watercolor brands
Companies based in Bavaria
Companies established in 1761
Fountain pen and ink manufacturers
German brands
Office supply companies of Germany
Pencil brands
Writing implement manufacturers